"Dear God" is a song by American heavy metal band Avenged Sevenfold. It was released as the fourth single from their self-titled fourth studio album.

Overview
"Dear God" was released as the fourth single from the album. The song was a notable deviation from the band's usual heavy metal style, taking on more of a country feel. Johnny Christ has stated that the inspiration for the song came from the band's friendship with country act Big & Rich. Their influence can be heard in the background vocals of MuzikMafia member Shanna Crooks.

Track listing

Chart positions

Personnel
All credits adapted from the album's liner notes.
Avenged Sevenfold
M. Shadows – lead vocals, backing vocals
Zacky Vengeance – rhythm guitar, acoustic guitar, backing vocals
The Rev - drums, percussion, piano, backing vocals
Synyster Gates – lead guitar, backing vocals
Johnny Christ – bass guitar, backing vocals

Session musicians
Lap, pedal steel and banjo by Greg Leisz
Additional vocals by Shanna Crooks
Production
Produced by Avenged Sevenfold
Engineered by Fred Archambault and Dave Schiffman, assisted by Clifton Allen, Chris Steffen, Robert DeLong, Aaron Walk, Mike Scielzi, and Josh Wilbur
Mixed by Andy Wallace
Mastered by Brian Gardner
Drum tech by Mike Fasano
Guitar tech by Walter Rice
'Fan Producers for a Day' (MVI) by Daniel McLaughlin and Christopher Guinn

References

2008 songs
Avenged Sevenfold songs
American blues rock songs
Country rock songs